The National Fraud Intelligence Bureau is a police unit in the United Kingdom responsible for gathering and analysing intelligence relating to fraud and financially motivated cyber crime. The NFIB was created as part of the recommendations of the 2006 National Fraud Review, which also saw the formation of the National Fraud Authority. The NFIB was developed and is overseen by the City of London Police as part of its role as a national lead for economic crime investigation, and is funded by the Home Office.

Overview
The NFIB analyses information from a large number of organisations within the public and private sectors, including industry, commerce and government sources. Investigators from both law enforcement and private sector backgrounds analyse the raw intelligence for distinct patterns of fraudulent activity and behaviour. When patterns are spotted, such as an identifying a persistent offender or linked activities, intelligence reports are sent to relevant regional police or law enforcement organisations for investigation, which may involve enquiries throughout the UK and overseas. The public, as well as businesses and the police can report fraud to the NFIB using the national fraud reporting service, called Action Fraud.

Action Fraud
About 90 investigators, who are not police officers, work at the NFIB in the City of London.

Action Fraud is the UK's national reporting service for fraud and financially motivated cyber crime. It was transferred to the City of London Police after the National Fraud Authority was closed in March 2014. Action Fraud has a website and call centre which provide information about different types of fraud and offer prevention advice. Individuals and businesses can report fraud (such as forwarding scam emails for inspection) to Action Fraud on their website or by telephone. When a fraud is reported to Action Fraud, victims are given a crime reference number and their case is passed on to the National Fraud Intelligence Bureau.

There were about 85 call-handling staff working on the Action Fraud helpline in November 2014 which fell to 70 by December 2015. Action Fraud staff are employed by contractor Concentrix. Numbers increased to about 80 staff in 2018.

Effectiveness
Despite its title, Action Fraud does not take action to resolve cases of fraud: it is a reporting and analysis centre only.  An investigation by Which?, the Consumers Association, published in September 2018, found that only a quarter of cases reported to Action Fraud were passed on to local police forces for action, and that fewer than 4% of cases handled by Action Fraud resulted in anyone being charged or otherwise dealt with by the justice system (this compares, for example, with 80% of cases involving drug abuse).  A BBC Radio 4 'File on 4 programme' on 17 November 2019 was devoted to disappointing experiences by people who had been advised to report their fraud problems to Action Fraud and received no redress, despite often being passed round a long list of agencies including Action Fraud, the City of London Police and a series of local police forces.  It was suggested that, at a time of severe cuts in police funding, fraud cases, which are typically complex and costly to resolve, were from resource motives being declined by police forces and passed on to Action Fraud, even though the agency has no enforcement powers.

In an investigation by the Times Newspaper in 2019, it was revealed by an undercover reporter that call handlers working for the police insult victims of fraud and have been trained to mislead them into thinking their cases will be investigated when most are never looked at again although fraud makes up a third of all crime in England and Wales.

A computer scoring system algorithm reduces the vast majority of reports to information reports, not crime reports and then only a handful are passed to the National Fraud Intelligence Bureau.

In April 2019, a major watchdog report condemned the police for having a defeatist culture in relation to investigating fraud. Politicians and campaigners have said the need for change was now urgent.

See also
British intelligence agencies
National Crime Agency
National Police Chiefs' Council
Serious Fraud Office

References

External links

National Fraud Intelligence Bureau on the City of London Police website
Action Fraud website

2010 establishments in the United Kingdom
Fraud in the United Kingdom
Fraud organizations
Government agencies established in 2010
National law enforcement agencies of the United Kingdom
City of London Police